Daniel Nestor and Nenad Zimonjić were the defending champions, but chose not to participate together.  Nestor plays alongside Rohan Bopanna.  Zimonjić teamed up with Aisam-ul-Haq Qureshi, but lost in the quarterfinals to Robert Lindstedt and Marcin Matkowski.

Seeds

Draw

Finals

References 
Main Draw

M